Baldwin Hills is an American reality television series featuring African-American teenagers from the Baldwin Hills district in Los Angeles, California.  The series aired on BET from July 2007 to March 2009.

Overview 
Baldwin Hills features the lives of wealthy African American teens growing up in the Los Angeles neighborhood Baldwin Hills, sometimes referred to as the "Black Beverly Hills". Baldwin Hills gives BET's primarily black audience an alternative to MTV's Laguna Beach.  The shows first season focused mainly on Moriah and his relationship with Gerren, it also focuses on Jordan trying to get his career in the promoting industry up and running.

Cast

Main

Recurring

Seasons

References

External links
 On BET
 

2000s American reality television series
2007 American television series debuts
2009 American television series endings
BET original programming
English-language television shows
Television shows set in Los Angeles
TV